Peschany is a rural locality (a khutor) and the administrative center of Peschanovskoye Rural Settlement, Serafimovichsky District, Volgograd Oblast, Russia. The population was 616 as of 2010.

Geography 
Peschany is located 67 km southwest of Serafimovich (the district's administrative centre) by road. Posyolok otdeleniya 3 sovkhoza Ust-Medveditsky is the nearest rural locality.

References 

Rural localities in Serafimovichsky District